This was the first edition of the tournament.

Panna Udvardy won the title, defeating Elina Avanesyan in the final, 0–6, 6–4, 6–3.

Seeds

Draw

Finals

Top half

Bottom half

References

External Links
Main Draw

Aberto da República - Singles